Watts Warehouse is a large, ornate Victorian Grade II* listed building standing on Portland Street in the centre of Manchester, England. It opened in 1856 as a textile warehouse for the wholesale drapery business of S & J Watts, and was the largest single-occupancy textile warehouse in Manchester. Today the building is part of the Britannia Hotels chain.

History

The Watts family
The textile firm, S & J Watts Limited was founded by James Watts (Mayor of Manchester), a Mancunian industrialist and entrepreneur, whose textile business had started in a small weaver's cottage in Didsbury. His success as a cotton trader was part of the commercial boom of the 19th century that gave Manchester the name "Cottonopolis", when the city was a global centre for the cotton trade.

Watts became an important figure among British industrialists, socialising with politicians and churchmen at his home, Abney Hall, in Cheadle. Prince Albert chose to stay with him when he visited Manchester to open the Art Treasures Exhibition in 1857. Watts' descendants include British businessman James Watts, Conservative party politician James Watts and air commandant Dame Felicity Peake. The Watts family is also distantly related to the family of novelist Agatha Christie.

Construction

The sandstone ashlar warehouse was built by local architects Travis & Mangnall in 1851–56 at a cost of £100,000. Its ornate style typifies the extravagant confidence of many Mancunian warehouses of this period, but the Watts Warehouse is notable for its peculiarly eclectic design. Designed in the form of a Venetian palazzo, the building has five storeys, each decorated in a different style – Italian Renaissance, Elizabethan, French Renaissance and Flemish – and roof pavilions featuring large Gothic wheel windows.

The interior was similarly lavish in its decoration, with a sweeping iron cantilever staircase, balconied stairwell, and mahogany counters for displaying merchandise.

War memorial
 During the First World War 1914–18, many employees of S & J Watts lost their lives in battle. The company marked this by erecting a memorial in 1922 in the main entrance to the building on Portland Street. A bronze sculpture, "the Sentry", stands in an arched niche on the right, and on the opposite side is a marble plaque commemorating the dead. The bronze statue depicts the sentry wearing a Tommy helmet, World War I battle gear and a cape, standing on guard with his rifle with fixed bayonet upright, and was commissioned from the British sculptor Charles Sargeant Jagger who also designed the Royal Artillery Memorial at Hyde Park Corner, London. A statuette version of the figure is to be seen in the study of Eltham Palace, where it was displayed by Stephen Courtauld, who was – like Jagger – a member of the Artists' Rifles during the First World War.

The Blitz
During the Second World War, the Watts Warehouse was hit by Luftwaffe bombs, but it was saved from destruction when the fire was smothered by textiles.

Conversion to a hotel
The textile industries that built Manchester eventually dwindled and, like many other industrial structures in the North of England, Watts Warehouse fell into disuse and was derelict for many years. The building was threatened with demolition in 1972, but was spared. In the 1980s, the building underwent conversion, retaining many of the original interior features. In May 1982, the Britannia Hotel opened as part of the Britannia Hotels chain initially with 25 rooms and a nightclub, eventually expanding to 363 bedrooms.

The building was Grade II* listed in 1952. The war memorial in the lobby appears on the Imperial War Museum's register.

See also

Architecture of Manchester
Grade II* listed buildings in Greater Manchester
Listed buildings in Manchester-M1

References

External links

How We Built Britain – 5. The North: Full Steam Ahead (BBC Television)
A brief history of Britannia Hotels
Textile Warehouses in Manchester – Manchester UK
The Britannia Hotel – Manchester Online
The Britannia Hotel in Manchester – National Archive

Commercial buildings in Manchester
Hotels in Manchester
Warehouses in England
World War I memorials in the United Kingdom
Monuments and memorials in Manchester
Commercial buildings completed in 1856
1856 establishments in England
Grade II* listed buildings in Manchester
Grade II* listed commercial buildings
Grade II* listed industrial buildings
Stone buildings
Piccadilly Gardens